Icknield Port Road railway station was a railway station in England, built by the Harborne Railway and operated by the London and North Western Railway in 1874.

It served the Summerfield area of Birmingham and, from 1897, was located near to the junction of Icknield Port Road and Gillott Road. Prior to that it had been between Icknield Port Road and Barford Rd, but the platform became too short when trains were lengthened.

The station closed in 1931, and there is little evidence of the station on the ground today. The trackbed through the station is now part of the Harborne Nature Walk.

References

British History Online: Birmingham Communications

Disused railway stations in Birmingham, West Midlands
Railway stations in Great Britain opened in 1874
Railway stations in Great Britain closed in 1931
Former London and North Western Railway stations